Vinayakan T. K. is an Indian actor, playback singer, and composer who predominantly works in the Malayalam film industry. He has also appeared in some Tamil language films. He started his career with a cameo appearance in the 1995 film Maanthrikam. Later, he did a couple of films as supporting roles as well as comedian roles.

In 2016, Vinayakan won the Kerala State Film Award for Best Actor for his leading role of Ganga in Rajiv Ravi's Kammatipaadam and it was well appreciated by the critics. He also composed a song for the film.

Career

Acting
Vinayakan began his career as a dancer and had a dance troupe named Black Mercury with Fire dance being his forte. Director Thampi Kannanthanam introduced him in Maanthrikam and later in Onnaman. He was noticed for his performances in  Stop Violence, Vellithira, Chathikkatha Chanthu, Chotta Mumbai and Thottappan. Also, he appeared in a couple of Bollywood movies.

Vinayakan was appreciated for his performance as Ganga in Rajeev Ravi' s 2016 film Kammatipaadam, and nominated for national award. It also brought him the Best Actor Award of Kerala State Film Awards, The North American Film Award for Outstanding performance in a film, Best Actor Award (2016) of Cinema Paradiso Club Cine Awards, etc. In the same film, he made his debut as a music director.

Music
Vinayakan composed the song "Puzhu Pulikal" for the movie Kammatipaadam..He has also sung songs for Rafi's new film Role Models and another one for Ordinary fame, Sugeeth's upcoming movie.

Personal life

Awards

Filmography

Malayalam

Other languages

References

External links 
 

Living people
Male actors in Malayalam cinema
Indian male film actors
Indian male dancers
Year of birth missing (living people)
Dancers from Kerala
Male actors in Tamil cinema
Male actors from Kochi
Kerala State Film Award winners
21st-century Indian male actors
20th-century Indian male actors